Johann Baptist Drechsler  (28 January 1766 – 28 April 1811) was an Austrian painter of flowers

Life
Drechsler was born in Vienna in 1766, the son of a porcelain painter. In 1787 he became the first professor of flower-painting at the  Academy of Fine Arts in Vienna, where his students included Josef Nigg and Franz Xaver Petter. His style was particularly influenced  by the finely detailed work of the Dutch flower-painter Jan van Huysum. He is recorded as working at the Vienna Porcelain Manufactory between 1772 and 1782.

There are examples of his work in the Hermitage at St. Petersburg, and in the Kunsthistorisches Museum.

He died at Vienna in 1811.

Gallery

References

Sources

 

18th-century Austrian painters
18th-century Austrian male artists
Austrian male painters
19th-century Austrian painters
19th-century Austrian male artists
Flower artists
1766 births
1811 deaths
Artists from Vienna
Academic staff of the Academy of Fine Arts Vienna
Porcelain painters